Tetratheca procumbens, also known as mountain pink-bells, is a species of flowering plant in the quandong family that is endemic to Australia.

Description
The species grows as a small, procumbent to weakly ascending shrub to 5–30 cm in height. The linear leaves are 2–8 mm long and 0.5–2 mm wide. The flowers are lilac-pink or white, with petals 3–5 mm long, appearing from October to December.

Distribution and habitat
The species is found in Victoria, in mountain country north of Heyfield, as well as in Tasmania, where the plants grow in low subalpine heathland on peat soils or sphagnum near bogs and streams.

References

procumbens
Flora of Tasmania
Flora of Victoria (Australia)
Oxalidales of Australia
Taxa named by Joseph Dalton Hooker
Plants described in 1855